Parliamentary elections were held in Portugal on 2 May 1897. Boycotted by the Portuguese Republican Party, they resulted in a victory for the Progressive Party, which won 88 seats.

Results

The results exclude seats from overseas territories.

References

Legislative elections in Portugal
Portugal
1897 elections in Portugal
May 1897 events